Bruce Taylor (born 1960) is a Canadian poet.  A graduate of McGill University and the University of Toronto, he lives in Wakefield, Quebec with his family.

Published works
 Getting on with the Era (Villeneuve, 1987)
 Cold Rubber Feet (Cormorant, 1989)
  Next Door (Taylor, Bruce. 1998. Next Door kalliope: a Journal of women’s literature and art. http://purl.flvc.org/fscj/fd/Kalliope1998_01. 20(1). Pages (34))

Awards: A. M. Klein Prize for Poetry; Opening poem winner of the E. J. Pratt Medal and Prize for excellence from the University of Toronto.
 Facts  (Signal/Vehicle, 1998)
Award: A. M. Klein Prize for Poetry
 No End in Strangeness: New and Selected Poems (Cormorant Books, 2011)

References

1960 births
Living people
20th-century Canadian poets
Canadian male poets
McGill University alumni
University of Toronto alumni
Canadian people of Scottish descent
People from Outaouais
Writers from Quebec
Anglophone Quebec people
20th-century Canadian male writers